Nipuna Ranawaka (born 1 November 1990) is a Sri Lankan businessman, politician and Member of Parliament.

Ranawaka was born on 1 November 1990. He is a nephew of former President Gotabaya Rajapaksa and former Prime Minister Mahinda Rajapaksa. He was educated at Royal College, Colombo and has degree in business management. He owns several businesses in the tourism sector. He is a member of Nilwala Neluma Foundation.

Ranawaka contested the 2020 parliamentary election as a Sri Lanka People's Freedom Alliance electoral alliance candidate in the Matara District and was elected to the Parliament of Sri Lanka.

References

External links
 The Rajapaksa Ancestry

1990 births
Alumni of Royal College, Colombo
Living people
Members of the 16th Parliament of Sri Lanka
Nipuna Ranawaka
Sinhalese businesspeople
Sinhalese politicians
Sri Lankan Buddhists
Sri Lanka People's Freedom Alliance politicians
Sri Lanka Podujana Peramuna politicians